Events from the year 1913 in Scotland.

Incumbents 

 Secretary for Scotland and Keeper of the Great Seal – Thomas McKinnon Wood

Law officers 
 Lord Advocate – Alexander Ure; then Robert Munro
 Solicitor General for Scotland – Andrew Anderson; then Thomas Brash Morison

Judiciary 
 Lord President of the Court of Session and Lord Justice General – Lord Dunedin until 14 October; then Lord Strathclyde
 Lord Justice Clerk – Lord Kingsburgh
 Chairman of the Scottish Land Court – Lord Kennedy

Events 

 26 February – the Royal Flying Corps establishes the first operational military airfield for fixed-wing aircraft in the United Kingdom at Montrose.
 21 April – the Cunard ocean liner , built by John Brown & Company, is launched on the River Clyde.
 27 May – Lieutenant Desmond Arthur dies when his Royal Aircraft Factory B.E.2 biplane, 205, collapses without warning while flying over Montrose, Scotland's first fatal aircraft accident.
 6 June – Stoneyetts Hospital is opened at East Muckcroft (later part of Moodiesburn, North Lanarkshire), originally for the treatment of people with epilepsy.
 22 July – Edinburgh Zoo opens.
 3 August – 22 men are killed by fire at Cadder colliery near Bishopbriggs.
 Dollar, Clackmannanshire, becomes the first Scottish town to appoint a Lady Provost, Lavinia Malcolm.
 Arrol-Johnston have a purpose-built car factory erected near Dumfries.
 Alexanders' Motor Services, predecessor of W. Alexander & Sons, begins running 'omnibus' services in the Falkirk area from a base in Camelon.
 Temperance (Scotland) Act 1913 permits local communities to hold polls (from 1920) on whether prohibition should apply in their districts.
 William Crawford bakes biscuits at Leith.
 The Neolithic site at Skara Brae on Mainland, Orkney, is plundered.
 Coal mining production in Scotland peaks at 43.2 million tonnes, employing over 140,000 men and women, who, with their families, make up 10% of the Scottish population.

Births 
 17 February – Alastair Borthwick, broadcaster and mountaineer (died 2003)
 6 March – Ella Logan, born Georgina Allan, musical theatre performer (died 1969 in the United States)
 18 March – W. H. Murray, mountaineer and writer (died 1996)
 2 April – Ronald Center, composer, (died 1973)
 2 April – Benny Lynch, flyweight boxer (died 1946)
 11 April – Winifred Drinkwater, aviator and first woman to hold a commercial pilot's license (died 1996 in New Zealand)
 13 April – Gordon Donaldson, historian (died 1993)  
 10 May – Alan Gemmell, plant biologist (died 1986)
 5 June – Sam Black, artist and teacher (died 1997 in Canada)
 5 June – Douglas Young, classicist, poet and Scottish National Party leader (died 1973 in the United States)
 25 July – John Cairncross, public servant, spy for the Soviet Union, academic and writer (died 1995 in England)
 29 July – William George Nicholson Geddes, civil engineer (died 1993)
 29 July – Jo Grimond, Liberal party leader (died 1993)
 11 August – Andy Beattie, professional football player and manager, first manager of the Scottish national football team (died 1983)
 2 September – Bill Shankly, international footballer and manager (died 1981)
 15 December – Robert McIntyre, Scottish National Party leader (died 1998)
Robert MacBryde, still-life and figure painter, and theatre set designer (died 1966 in Dublin)

Deaths 
 18 January – George Alexander Gibson, physician and geologist (born 1854)
 20 February – Sir William Arrol, civil engineering contractor (born 1839)
 12 May – William McEwan, Liberal Party MP (1886-1900) and brewer (born 1827)
 6 September – James Orr, Presbyterian minister, and professor of church history and of theology (born 1844)
 23 September – James Campbell Noble, painter (born 1832)
 21 November – James Howden, mechanical engineer (born 1846)
 Sir George Reid, artist (born 1841)

Arts and literature 
 26 May – Campbeltown Picture House (cinema) opens.

See also 
 Timeline of Scottish history
 1913 in the United Kingdom

References 

 
Scotland
Years of the 20th century in Scotland
1910s in Scotland